Dokan District is a district of the Sulaymaniyah Governorate, Kurdistan Region, Iraq. Its main town is Dokan.

References 

Districts of Sulaymaniyah Province
Geography of Iraqi Kurdistan